Tepoxteco is a town of the municipality Chicontepec de Tejeda, in the state of Veracruz, eastern Mexico. This town has got 462 inhabitants, many people still speak the nahuatl language.

References

Populated places in Veracruz